The 18th National Congress of the Kuomintang was the eighteenth national congress of the Kuomintang political party, held on 17 October 2009 at Xinzhuang Baseball Stadium, Taipei, Taiwan.

History
The 18th congress was originally planned to be held earlier on 12 September 2013 but was postponed to address the relief efforts of Typhoon Morakot.

Results
The 18th congress saw the inauguration of Ma Ying-jeou to become Chairman of the Kuomintang for the second time after winning the chairmanship election held on 29 July 2009, succeeding the incumbent KMT Chairman Wu Po-hsiung who was retiring. Former Chairman Wu and Lien Chan were appointed as Honorary Chairmen to assist Chairman Ma in Taiwan's external affairs and cross-strait relations, respectively. Chan Chun-po, the Secretary-General to the President was inaugurated as the Secretary-General of the Kuomintang.

Reactions outside Taiwan
 - CPC General Secretary Hu Jintao sent a congratulatory message to Chairman Ma. In response, Ma also gave a warm reply.

See also
 Kuomintang

References

National Congresses of the Kuomintang
Politics of Taiwan
2009 conferences
2009 in Taiwan